Shea Seger (born 1979) is an American singer-songwriter born in Fort Worth, Texas.  Her sound has been likened to a combination of Janis Joplin, Sheryl Crow, Ani DiFranco and Tori Amos. Seger describes her music as "mutt dog... bluesy pop with beats".

Seger studied musical theatre in Virginia, before moving to London to record her first album. She currently resides in Virginia and is married to Jimmy Reeves, a graphic design artist.

She has toured with Toploader, James, David Gray and John Mayer.

Discography

Studio albums
 The May Street Project (2000)
 Shea Seger (2010)
 The Shack (2019)

Singles
 "Last Time" (2000)
 "Clutch" (2001)
 "I Love You Too Much" (2001)

The track "Clutch" peaked at number 47 in the UK Singles Chart in May 2001. 

She contributed two tracks to the soundtrack of the film Railed (2008), written and directed by Ryan Fox. The tracks were "Hourglass" and "Surrender".

On July 19, 2010, Seger released her self-titled second album through the independent record label Truthcore.

References

External links

1979 births
Living people
People from Fort Worth, Texas
American expatriates in the United Kingdom